Nine Songs of the Moving Heavens, is a Chinese animated CG TV series which was released on March 10, 2016, and produced by Robin Shen and directed by Chen Qianyuan. It can also be translated as Nine Songs of the Sky. This series is the prequel to The Legend of Qin, which takes place before the time of the Qin dynasty. In an interview with Robin Shen, it was stated although the two animated series have intersections of characters and timelines, Nine Songs of the Moving Heavens is an independent story with the focus on the creation of the Quicksand group by the Ninth Prince of Han, Han Fei.

Story
During the Warring States period in China, danger seems to lurk within the Han State which is seen to be the weakest of the Seven States. It is under threat from the more powerful Qin State while the ageing Han King is losing his grip on power due to internal power struggles. The greatest threat is the Great General of Han, Ji Wuye and the Four Fearful Warriors of Nightfall, each specializing in military, finance, politics, and espionage.

The Ninth Prince of Han, Han Fei, hopes to create a new world with a stronger Han State which can overcome its internal problems and withstand the pressure from the Qin. He forms Quicksand with Wei Zhuang, Zhang Liang, Zinü, and Nong Yu, who support the Prince in realizing his goal while helping to combat the forces against him.

Characters

Main protagonists
The main Protagonists are a group associated with Han Fei and form the core of the Quicksand Group based in the Han State.
Han Fei
Voiced by: Zhao Lu
Han Fei is the Ninth Prince of the Han State. He appears quite carefree and is often seen drinking wine in the company of female entertainers.  He has no martial arts skills, however his intelligence is higher than most and he is a strategic thinker. As a young man he studied at the Junior Sage Village and was the best student under Xun Kuang. Over time, he became frustrated at the waste and corruption in Han State and formed the clandestine Quicksand group with Wei Zhuang and Zinü. First appearance: Episode 1.

Wei Zhuang
Voiced by: Wu Lei
Wei Zhuang is one of the only two students from the Ghost Valley and his Senior 'Brother' is Ge Nie, who is currently working for the Qin State protecting the young emperor, Ying Zheng. Wei Zhuang has kept a low profile for some time, but reappears and takes shelter in the Purple Orchid House and becomes a key player in Han Fei's Quicksand group. He maintains a detached appearance, appearing quite cold and unemotional. He is extremely skillful in martial arts and wields the sword Shachi (Shark Teeth). First appearance: Episode 4.

Zinü
Voiced by: Huang Ying
Zinü is the owner of the Purple Orchid House, a brothel, and is the wielder of the snake sword, Chilian. Along with Wei Zhuang, she is a founding member of in Han Fei's Quicksand group. She is intelligent, mature and charming, as well as being quite beautiful. She appears to have another identity and Zinü may not be her real name. First appearance: Episode 2 but officially appears in Episode 3.

Zhang Liang (Zifang)
Voiced by: Di Wei
Zhang Liang is the grandson of the Prime Minister of the Han State, Zhang Kaidi, and his courtesy name Zifang. He has a good nature and is very intelligent, which Han Fei greatly appreciates. In return, he has great respect for Han Fei. He willingly joins Quicksand and becomes an important comrade to Han Fei, Wei Zhuang, and Zinü. First appearance: Episode 3.

Honglian
Voiced by: Hong Haitian
Honglian is the precocious daughter of the Han Emperor and is affectionately cared for by her older brother, Han Fei. She is keen to make a contribution to Han Fei's plans, and joins his Quicksand group. She has a bright and cheerful nature, but can be quite astute when necessary. She began martial arts training with Wei Zhuang while Han Fei was away, and appears to have a crush on the swordsman. First appearance: Episode 2.

Nong Yu
Voiced by: Hong Haitian
Nong Yu plays the guqin in the Purple Orchid House and is highly valued by Zinü. Her music is favourably compared to the famous guqin composer from the Zhao State, Kuang Xiu. She learned to play music while quite young and when she plays, sometimes it triggers memories of her former rough life. She is very calm, polite, and quiet although there may be a different side to her personality. First appearance: Episode 2, officially appears in Episode 9.

Han State
One of the Seven States, and is considered to be the weakest.

Han Emperor, Han An
Voiced by: Gu Qiu
The Han Emperor, Han An is ageing and has become distressed with the events within the imperial court and the state. His most trusted advisors are General Ji Wuye and Prime Minister Zhang Kaidi; however, they have very differing opinions and objectives. He is under pressure to choose a successor, especially after his eldest son, the crown prince, dies. First appearance: Episode 3.

Ji Wuye
Voiced by: Meng Xianglong
Ji Wuye is the Great General of Qin. He has a ruthless and overbearing personality and dominates the imperial court as well as the population. He is ambitious for power and seeks to undermine the authority of the king. He is one of the four leaders of the powerful shadowy force known as "Nightfall". He is very strong and none could ever beat him. First appearance: Episode 3.

Zhang Kaidi
Voiced by: Cheng Yuzhu
Zhang Kaidi is the Prime Minister of Han, grandfather of Zhang Liang (Zifang). For five generations, the Zhang family has served as pillars for the emperor. Zhang Kaidi mistrusts Han Fei and his methods, but has respect for Han Fei's intelligence and turned to him for help on a mystery case. First appearance: Episode 3.

The Crown Prince of Han
Voiced by: Yu Xiaoxu
He is first in line for the succession and appears tough, however he has the reputation of being weak in the face of enemies and is considered a poor candidate for king. He is killed in what appears to be an accident when his carriage falls off a bridge into the water. First appearance: Episode 28.

Han Yu
Voiced by: Fan Junhang
Han Yu is the Fourth Prince of Han. He is a traditionalist, is politically astute, and surrounds himself with powerful and talented people. He is generally on good terms with Han Fei, but they are rivals for the succession and Han Yu pursues his own agenda. First appearance: Episode 13.

Han Qiancheng
Voiced by: Dai Chaoxing
Han Qiancheng is Han Yu's adopted son and is highly skilled in archery. First appearance: Episode 23.

Lord Anping
Lord Anping is one of the Han Emperor's brothers. First appearance: Episode 3.

Lord Longquan 
Lord Longquan is one of the Han Emperor's brothers. First appearance: Episode 3.

Liu Yi
Voiced by: Liu Yao
Liu Yi is the Left Minister of War, serving the Han State. He is also one of Ji Wuye's men. Zinü described Liu Yi as lustful and cruel. First appearance: Episode 10.

Lady Hu
Voiced by: Zhou Shuai
As the wife of the Left Minister of War, Liu Yi. She is well-educated and respectful, but mainly stays indoors and does not speak with women of high class. First appearance: Episode 11.

Beauty Hu
Voiced by: Luo Yuting
She is the beautiful and favorite concubine of the Han Emperor and is seemingly keeping a good relation with the Emperor's children. Her older sister is Lady Hu, wife of Liu Yi. However, Honglian calls her a vixen. First appearance: Episode 13.

Li Kai
Voiced by: Yinhai Fan
Li Kai is an aged man who was apparently dead, but has reappeared. It is later revealed that he was the Right Minister of War and was in love with Lady Hu. He is considered a traitor in the Han State. First appearance: Episode 10.

Nightfall
Nightfall is an organization under the Great General of Han, Ji Wuye, and consists of two groups. Firstly, the Four Fearful Warriors of Ji Wuye, Feicui Hu, Lady Mingzhu and Bai Yifei who work in the military, finance, politics, and espionage. Secondly, the Hundreds of Birds which is a group of trained assassins who are code-named after birds.

Moya
Voiced by: Xia Lei
 Moya is from Hundreds of Birds, Nightfall and wears black. He follows orders without question and is a most powerful fighter. He is quite ruthless, but can appear charming. He appears to be a mentor towards Baifeng. First appearance: Episode 2.

Baifeng
Voiced by: Xie tiantian
Baifeng is from Hundreds of Birds, Nightfall and wears white. He's Moya's subordinate, so they are often seen together. Baifeng seems more considered that Moya and tends to be quiet and serious, although he can joke with Moya. His lightness skill is impressive so that he almost appears weightless. First appearance: Episode 6, officially appears in Episode 8.

Bai Yifei
Voiced by: Liu Beichen
Bai Yifei is one of the Four Fearful Warriors of Nightfall and is known as the Pure White, Blood Marquess. He is the master of Snow Fort outside the capital, with army of 100,000 soldiers. His family has contributed greatly to the Han State in the past. It is rumoured that he drains the blood of his victims as was said of his mother, the only female Marquess in the Han State and master of the Bloody Fortress. First appearance: Episode 16.

Feicui Hu
Voiced by: Peng Bo
Feicui Hu is one of the Four Fearful Warriors of Nightfall, who is in charge of finance and possesses unimaginable wealth. Ji Wuye refers to him as "Old Hu". Feicui Hu is obsessed with wealth which becomes his downfall. He is killed by Bai Yifei after he loses his wealth and becomes a liability to Nightfall. First appearance: Episode 17.

Lady Mingzhu
Voiced by: Zhou Shuai
Lady Mingzhu is the Tide Enchantress of the Four Fearful Warriors and is also known as a master of healing although she also utilizes poisons. She is currently the primary concubine of the Han Emperor and is older than Beauty Hu whom she "little sister". First appearance: Episode 38.

Wujiu
Voiced by: Peng Bo
 He is one of the many assassins from Hundreds of Birds. He is an older man who is seemingly acting on his own accord. His motives are unclear. First appearance: Episode 10 (officially appears in Episode 15).

The Cloaked Man
Voiced by: Yu Xiaoxu
The Cloaked Man is the leader of the intelligence network and is responsible for monitoring all levels of the court for Ji Wuye. His face is never shown and Ji Wuye often meets him while he is fishing on a small boat offshore. First appearance: Episode 38.

Qin State
The Qin State is one of the Seven States, and is considered the strongest one.

Li Si
Voiced by: Liu Yijia
Li Si is Han Fei's Junior Brother, who studied under the same teacher at the Confucian School. He considered himself inferior to Han Fei and set off to work for the more powerful Qin State. First appearance: Episode 1, reappears in episode 47.

Lü Buwei
Voiced by: Wang Xiaobing
He is the Prime Minister of Qin, also titled as the Marquis Wenxin. The Emperor of Qin addresses Lü Buwei as his uncle. First appearance: Episode 2.

Ge Nie
Voiced by: Liu Qin
He the chief swordsman teacher of Qin after obtained the Qin Emperor's respect for both his sword skills and intelligence. He is very calm and observant and is Wei Zhuang's Senior 'Brother', whom he has not seen for a long time. First appearance: Episode 50.

Ying Zheng
The Emperor of Qin, later to be known as Qin Shi Huang. He fears death and searches for answers to whether the fate of mortals is controlled by some kind of greater power and travels under the pseudonym of Mister Shang. It is said that his rule over the state is weak because the Prime Minister wields more power. First appearance: Episode 51, but did appear briefly in episode 2.

General Wang Yi
The Left Chief of the Multitude in the state of Qin. General Wang Yi trains his troops very rigorously and is truly at military strategy. He has served three kings of Qin in his lifetime. First appearance: Episode 87.

The Chiliarch
A very conscientious and unnamed commander under General Wang Yi stationed in Wusui, on the border between Qin and Han. He is later revealed to be Meng Tien, an eighth-tier noble of Qin. First appearance: Episode 87.

Slick Octahedron
The Slick Octahedron is Qin's top assassin organization comprising eight assassins whose martial arts, appearances, and personalities are totally different.

Li Wu
She plays the flute and can dance. First appearance: Episode 52. But her shadow figure was actually seen in episode 50.
Qian Sha
A silent man who wields a sword. First appearance: Episode 50.
Zhen Hou
He seems to know Ying Zheng very well and is fond of drinking tea. First appearance: Episode 53.
Xun Feng
He can control bees. First appearance: Episode 53.
Kan Shu
The oldest man who loves real silver and gold. First appearance: Episode 55.
Dui Li
The youngest out of the eight. He is scared of blood and doesn't want to kill anyone. First appearance: Episode 55.
Kun Po
The oldest woman, who is always seen making medicine. First appearance: Episode 55.
Gen Shi 
A serious man with a heavily scarred face. Zhen Hou considers that his strength may rival that of the Ghost Valley disciples. First appearance: Episode 55.

Net Trap
Net Trap is a mysterious assassination group which is based in the State of Qin, but is not part of Qin. It consists of some assassins at a high level, but includes hundreds of operatives at the lower skill levels. Its activities cover the Seven States like a giant web.

Xuan Jian
Voiced by: Liang Dawei
The highest ranked "Heaven Level" assassin from Net Trap of the Qin State. "Xuan Jian" is the name of his black and white swords. He is used to be known by Goujian, King of Yue. A powerful swordsman who first gives Wei Zhuang serious wounds. First appearance: Episode 60.

Wu Qingsi
Rumor has it that she was killed after a failed assassination, but she actually joined Net Trap because Xuan Jian saved her. She's an embroideress that has cut the threads of love and she claims she is merely a black widow who weaves hatred. First appearance: Episode 69.

Yan Ri
Another "Heaven Level" ranked assassin of Net Trap. His real face has never been revealed and he only wears the armor of a foot soldier from Qin. First appearance: Episode 69.

Remnants of Baiyue
It is said that 10 years earlier, the Baiyue rebelled against Han Emperor. He later sent in the armies of the Blood Marquess's army and the state of Chu in the name of peacemaking, but wiped them out leaving only a few survivors.

Yanling Ji
Voiced by: Tao Dian
 She was imprisoned in a tank full of water and appeared to be able to breathe underwater. "Gentle like water and warm like fire" was how they described her. She uses fire to harm others. First appearance: Episode 20.

Wushuang Gui
Voiced by: Liu Qin in episode 21. Yu Xiaoxu in episode 28 and after.
Wushuang Gui doesn't speak. He has massive strength in attack and defense, making him very ruthless. His first appeared coming to save Yanling Ji who was imprisoned. First appearance: Episode 21.

Qu Shimo
Voiced by: Xu Xiang
He is a secret shaman chief, who can turn bodies and skeletons into zombies. He could herd all the corpses for a thousand miles. He is skilled in Baiyue's insanity arts. First appearance: Episode 25.

Bai Duwang
Voiced by: Wang Xiaobing
He is the most elderly out of the remnants of Baiyue. He is highly skilled in a type of Baiyue's poison arts, and can create illusions where people imaging snakes attacking them. First appearance: Episode 26.

Tian Ze
Voiced by: Chen Yu
Tian Ze is the Crown Prince of Baiyue and is specialized in sorcery. He is the Master of the Remnants of Baiyue. Due to his unusual looks, he is also known by Red Eyebrows Dragon Snake and Lord Red Eyebrows. He was imprisoned for 10 years and now plans to rebuild Baiyue. First appearance: Episode 26.

Wei State
The Wei State is one of the Seven States, bordering both Han and Qin States.
Wei Yong
He is the Minister of Public Works of the Wei State. Only appears in flashbacks. First appearance: Episode 65.

King of Wei
A King who relies on Wei Yong and the Great General of Wei as the Qin army attempts to invade their land. Only appears in flashbacks. First appearance: Episode 67.

Dian Qing
A huge and muscular man known as the Chiliarch. He is the disciple of the Great General of Wei as well as the best warrior in the army. Only appears in flashbacks. First appearance: Episode 67.

Xian Xian
She is the daughter of Wei Yong and is in love with Xuan Jian from Net Trap of the Qin state. Only appears in flashbacks. First appearance: Episode 67.

Empress Dowager Leling
The current Empress Dowager of Wei. She is Honglian's grandmother's sister and is very fond of Honglian. First appearance: Episode 79.

Other Characters
Xunzi
He is Han Fei's teacher, living in Sanghai. His full name is Xun Kuang. First appearance: Episode 1.

Hong Yu
She works in the Purple Orchid House and stays in the same room as Nong Yu. She is shown cleaning Nong Yu's guqin. First appearance: Episode 9.

Duxie Zi
Duxie Zi is a clan of assassins and also the name of the leader. Duxie means "Venomous Scorpion." It seems they hold people captive, ready to take them away. If someone wants one of them released, a price must be paid first. First appearance: Episode 14.

Tang Qi
He is the leader of the Qi Jue Clan. He acts as the informant to Wei Zhuang, and at the same time, Wei Zhuang helps him. Tang Qi refers him as his boss. First appearance: Episode 13.

Nilin
Nilin is the name of the sword, but the wielder's name is unknown. Or perhaps the wielder is the spirit of the sword itself. He only shows up to protect Han Fei when he's in danger. Officially appears in episode 17.

 Ghost Valley Master
His students are Ge Nie and Wei Zhuang. Every master of each generation in the Ghost Valley teaches only two students, who are destined to battle each other. First appearance: Episode 65.

Episodes

References
North American Official site

Official Chinese website for Sparkly Key

Tianxing Jiu Ge story introduction

2016 Chinese television series debuts
Chinese animated television series
Chinese wuxia television series
Mandarin-language television shows